Mahesh Saran was an Indian politician . He was a Member of Parliament, representing Bihar in the Rajya Sabha the upper house of India's Parliament as a member of the Indian National Congress.

References

Rajya Sabha members from Bihar
Indian National Congress politicians
1896 births
Year of death missing